Mushaima is a surname. Notable people with the surname include:

Ahmed Mushaima, Bahraini footballer 
Ali Abdulhadi Mushaima (1989–2011), young Bahraini who Monday 14 February 2011, the "Bahraini Day of Rage", became the first fatality of the Bahraini Uprising
Hasan Mushaima is an opposition leader in Bahrain and the secretary-general of the Haq Movement
Mohammed Mushaima (c.1988–2012), Shia Bahraini political activist